The Shire of Taroom was a local government area in the Darling Downs region of Queensland, Australia, along the Leichhardt Highway to the north of Miles.

The shire contained several national parks with eroded sandstone areas, as well as Isla Gorge.

History

Taroom Division was created on 11 November 1879 as one of 74 divisions around Queensland under the Divisional Boards Act 1879 with a population of 1015.

With the passage of the Local Authorities Act 1902, Taroom Division became the Shire of Taroom on 31 March 1903.

The Taroom War Memorial commemorates residents of Taroom Shire who served in World War I, World War II and the Vietnam War. It is located at the Ludwig Leichhardt Park in Yaldwyn Street and was dedicated in about 1973.

The Taroom Shire Council Chambers were located at 18 Yaldwyn Street, now used as the Taroom administration office of the Banana Shire Council.

The Taroom Town Hall was built in 2004, immediately next door to the shire council chambers. It was intended to serve as a civic and recreational centre for the town and has a main auditorium that seats 300 people, a commercial kitchen, and a bar. The hall was awarded a regional commendation by the Royal Australian Institute of Architects in 2004.

On 15 March 2008, under the Local Government (Reform Implementation) Act 2007 passed by the Parliament of Queensland on 10 August 2007, the Shire of Taroom was dissolved. Division 1 of the shire, centred on the town of Taroom, was merged into the Shire of Banana. The remainder of the Shire of Taroom, centred on the town of Wandoan was merged with the Town of Dalby and the shires of Chinchilla, Murilla, Tara and Wambo to create the new Dalby Region, renamed Western Downs Region on 29 June 2009. In doing so, Taroom became one of the only three former shires in Queensland not to stay intact, alongside the shires of Tiaro and Beaudesert.

On 29 September 2018, Taroom & District Historical Society Inc and Taroom RSL Sub Branch worked together to preserve the 1973 War Memorial by moving it from Leichhardt Park to the Taroom Museum at 17 Kelman Street, Taroom  (on the original site of the Taroom State School 1871-1956).

Towns and localities
The Shire of Taroom included the following settlements:

Division 1 (now part of the Shire of Banana):
 Taroom
 Ghinghinda
 Glenhaughton
 Gwambegwine
Division 2 (now part of the Western Downs Region):
 Grosmont
 Guluguba
 Wandoan

Population

Chairmen and mayors

This is a list of chairmen and mayors of Taroom Shire Council:
 1880-????: Charles James Royds
1898-1902 George Cartwright Langhorne
1902-1914: Alfred Ernest Devine
1914-1918: William John Ashton
1918-1943 John Mundell
1943-1944 Barney Carr Clark
1944-1945 Alfred William Henry Villiers (administrator)
1945-1946: Barney Carr Clark
1946-1954: Richard (Dick) Rigby
1954-1955: J.R. Knack
1955-1957: Henry G. Weldon
1957-1964: Donald Stuart Scott
1964-1979: Gustav Arthur Stiller
1979-1994: William Harold Copeland
1994-1997: Colin Jame Kehl
 1997–2008: Donald Frank (Don) Stiller

References

External links
  — archived official website

Former local government areas of Queensland
Darling Downs
2008 disestablishments in Australia
Populated places disestablished in 2008
1879 establishments in Australia